This article displays the rosters for the participating teams at the 2007 All-Africa Games (men's basketball tournament).

|}
| valign="top" |
 Head coach

 Assistant coach

Legend
 (C) Team captain
 Club field describes current club
|}

|}
| valign="top" |
 Head coach

 Assistant coach

Legend
 (C) Team captain
 Club field describes current club
|}

|}
| valign="top" |
 Head coach

 Assistant coach

Legend
 (C) Team captain
 Club field describes current club
|}

|}
| valign="top" |
 Head coach

 Assistant coach

Legend
 (C) Team captain
 Club field describes current club
|}

|}
| valign="top" |
 Head coach

 Assistant coach

Legend
 (C) Team captain
 Club field describes current club
|}

|}
| valign="top" |
 Head coach

 Assistant coach

Legend
 (C) Team captain
 Club field describes current club
|}

|}
| valign="top" |
 Head coach

 Assistant coach

Legend
 (C) Team captain
 Club field describes current club
|}

|}
| valign="top" |
 Head coach

 Assistant coach

Legend
 (C) Team captain
 Club field describes current club
|}

|}
| valign="top" |
 Head coach

 Assistant coach

Legend
 (C) Team captain
 Club field describes current club
|}

|}
| valign="top" |
 Head coach

 Assistant coach

Legend
 (C) Team captain
 Club field describes current club
|}

|}
| valign="top" |
 Head coach

 Assistant coach

Legend
 (C) Team captain
 Club field describes current club
|}

See also
 2007 FIBA Africa Championship squads

References

Basketball at the 2007 All-Africa Games
African Games basketball squads